James B. Cook was an English-trained architect who worked in Memphis, Tennessee in the 1800s.

He was born in England and educated at King's College and Putney College. He served as a supervising architect on the construction of the Crystal Palace for London's Great Exhibition of 1851. He immigrated to the U.S. in 1855.

He designed submarines for the Confederate army in the American Civil War.

A number of his works are listed on the U.S. National Register of Historic Places.

Calvary Episcopal Church and Parish House, (1843), Gothic Revival, 102 N. 2nd St. Memphis, TN, NRHP-listed
Church of Our Savior, E. Eastport St. between Main and Fulton Sts. Iuka, MS, NRHP-listed
Grace Episcopal Church, 555 Vance Ave. Memphis, TN, NRHP-listed
Holy Innocents' Episcopal Church, Jct. of Main & Craig St. Como, MS, NRHP-listed
Jail Building, Sardis, MS non extant thus not on NRHP
Panola County Courthouse, Sardis, MS non extant thus not on NRHP
St. Mary's Catholic Church, 155 Market St. Memphis, TN, NRHP-listed
Tate County Courthouse, 201 S. Ward St. Senatobia, MS, NRHP-listed
Trinity Church, Main St. Mason, TN, NRHP-listed

He was associated with Andrew Johnson, a contractor and architect in northern Mississippi.

References

Architects from Tennessee
19th-century American architects
People from Memphis, Tennessee
British emigrants to the United States
Year of birth missing
Year of death missing